{{DISPLAYTITLE:Muscarinic acetylcholine receptor M3}}

The muscarinic acetylcholine receptor, also known as cholinergic/acetylcholine receptor M3, or the muscarinic 3, is a muscarinic acetylcholine receptor encoded by the human gene CHRM3.

The M3 muscarinic receptors are located at many places in the body, e.g., smooth muscles, the endocrine glands, the exocrine glands, lungs, pancreas and the brain. In the CNS, they induce emesis. Muscarinic M3 receptors are expressed in regions of the brain that regulate insulin homeostasis, such as the hypothalamus and dorsal vagal complex of the brainstem. These receptors are highly expressed on pancreatic beta cells and are critical regulators of glucose homoestasis by modulating insulin secretion. In general, they cause smooth muscle contraction and increased glandular secretions.

They are unresponsive to PTX and CTX.

Mechanism
Like the M1 muscarinic receptor, M3 receptors are coupled to G proteins of class Gq, which upregulate phospholipase C and, therefore, inositol trisphosphate and intracellular calcium as a signalling pathway. The calcium function in vertebrates also involves activation of protein kinase C and its effects.

Effects

Smooth muscle
Because the M3 receptor is Gq-coupled and mediates an increase in intracellular calcium, it typically causes constriction of smooth muscle, such as that observed during bronchoconstriction. However, with respect to vasculature, activation of M3 on vascular endothelial cells causes increased synthesis of nitric oxide, which diffuses to adjacent vascular smooth muscle cells and causes their relaxation and vasodilation, thereby explaining the paradoxical effect of parasympathomimetics on vascular tone and bronchiolar tone. Indeed, direct stimulation of vascular smooth muscle M3 mediates vasoconstriction in pathologies wherein the vascular endothelium is disrupted.

Diabetes
The muscarinic M3 receptor regulates insulin secretion from the pancreas and are an important target for understanding the mechanisms of type 2 diabetes mellitus.

Some antipsychotic drugs that are prescribed to treat schizophrenia and bipolar disorder (such as olanzapine and clozapine) have a high risk of diabetes side-effects. These drugs potently bind to and block the muscarinic M3 receptor, which causes insulin dysregulation that may precede diabetes.

Other
The M3 receptors are also located in many glands, both endocrine and exocrine glands, and help to stimulate secretion in salivary glands and other glands of the body.

Other effects are:
increased  secretions from stomach
eye accommodation

Agonists
No highly selective M3 agonists are yet available as of 2018, but a number of non-selective muscarinic agonists are active at M3.
acetylcholine
bethanechol
carbachol
 L-689,660 (mixed M1/M3 agonist)
oxotremorine
pilocarpine (in eye)
muscarine

Antagonists
 atropine
 tramadol
 hyoscyamine

 aclidinium bromide
 4-DAMP (1,1-Dimethyl-4-diphenylacetoxypiperidinium iodide, CAS# 1952-15-4)
 darifenacin
 diphenhydramine
 fluoxetine
 DAU-5884 (8-Methyl-8-azabicyclo-3-endo[1.2.3]oct-3-yl-1,4-dihydro-2-oxo-3(2H)-quinazolinecarboxylic acid ester, CAS# 131780-47-7)
 HL-031,120 ((3R,2'R)-enantiomer of EA-3167)
 ipratropium
 J-104,129 ((aR)-a-Cyclopentyl-a-hydroxy-N-[1-(4-methyl-3-pentenyl)-4-piperidinyl]benzeneacetamide, CAS# 244277-89-2)
 oxybutynin
 procyclidine
 tiotropium
 tolterodine
 zamifenacin ((3R)-1-[2-(1-,3-Benzodioxol-5-yl)ethyl]-3-(diphenylmethoxy)piperidine, CAS# 127308-98-9)
 solifenacin

Interactions 
Muscarinic acetylcholine receptor M3 has been shown to pre-couple with Gq proteins. The polybasic c-tail of the receptor is necessary for the pre-coupling. It has also been shown to interact with Arf6 and ARF1.

See also 
 Muscarinic acetylcholine receptor

References

Further reading

External links 
 
 
 

Muscarinic acetylcholine receptors